Rane Corporation is an American pro audio equipment manufacturer.  Located in Mukilteo, Washington, it was made up of former employees of Phase Linear Corporation, and started out with products aimed at small live bands.  They now carry many products.

They provide extensive technical documents about audio equipment setup and design, including proper grounding, interconnections, noise, measurement standards, a glossary of industry terms, and more.

In 2016, Rane Corporation was purchased by InMusic Brands

See also 
 Scratch Live

References

External links 
 Company website
 Biography
 Technical library
 Pro Audio Reference

Manufacturers of professional audio equipment
Companies based in Mukilteo, Washington
Audio mixing console manufacturers
Audio equipment manufacturers of the United States